Hohhot Baita International Airport  is an international airport serving Hohhot, the capital of Inner Mongolia, China. In 2013 it served 6,150,282 passengers.

History
Hohhot Baita Airport was opened on 1 October 1958. In the mid-1980s and 1990s, it underwent two expansions and in June 2007 a new terminal was constructed. Its runway was also lengthened and its widened to accommodate jumbo jets such as the Airbus A380. It served as one of the diversion airports for air traffic during the 2008 Summer Olympics.

With the rapid expansion of the city, Baita Airport is now surrounded by urban area and has no more room to expand to accommodate growing traffic. The Hohhot Shengle International Airport is being constructed in Horinger County to replace Baita Airport.

Airlines and destinations

Cargo

Transport
It is served by Bayan (Airport) station on Line 1 of Hohhot Metro.

See also
List of airports in China

References

External links

Official website

Airports in Inner Mongolia
Hohhot
Airports established in 1958
1958 establishments in China